Charles Clay Anderson (September 29, 1917 – February 13, 1975) was an all-star and Grey Cup-champion professional Canadian football player.

Biography
Anderson graduated from Ohio State and turned pro in 1945 and 1946 with the Hollywood Bears in the Pacific Coast Football League (along with Ezzert Anderson, who would also later play pro in Canada.) After playing with the Los Angeles Bulldogs of the PCFL (in 1947) he took his multi-talented skills (he could play any position on the offensive line) to Canada, where he won a Grey Cup in 1948 with the undefeated Calgary Stampeders. In a twist of fate, he joined the Montreal Alouettes the next season and defeated his former (championship) team to win another Grey Cup.  He played with the Larks for three seasons (missing 1951 after a tryout with the Hamilton Tiger-Cats) and finished his career with the Ottawa Rough Riders in 1953.

Following the path blazed by Herb Trawick, the first professional African-American player in the Canadian leagues, Anderson was among the first to break the colour barrier. He died after an illness of two and a half years in a hospital in Louisville, Ohio, on February 13, 1975.

References

Calgary Stampeders players
Montreal Alouettes players
Ohio State Buckeyes football players
Ottawa Rough Riders players
Sportspeople from Montgomery, Alabama
African-American players of Canadian football
1917 births
1975 deaths
20th-century African-American sportspeople